Platypria (Platypria) echidna, is a species of leaf beetle found India, Sri Lanka, Myanmar and Vietnam.

Description
Antenna thin, which is extending beyond scutellum over pronotum. There are six spines on each side of the anterior lateral lobe of the elytra. Elytra is covered with white pubescence. Elytral punctures are large and sub-quadrate. The anterior and posterior-lateral lobes on the elytra are reddish.

Biology
Adult female lays a single egg covered with secretions that becomes an ootheca. Larva is a leaf miner that feed and live in mesophyll tissues.  It is found in wide varieties of host plants including: Mallotus, Desmodium gangeticum, Erythrina subumbrans, Erythrina lithosperma, Erythrina variegata, Pueraria tuberosa, Ziziphus mauritiana, Ziziphus nummularia, Ziziphus oenoplia, Ziziphus rugosa, and Ziziphus xylopyrus.

References 

Cassidinae
Insects of Sri Lanka
Beetles described in 1840